Yula is a genus of moths of the family Noctuidae.

Taxonomy
Yula is treated as a valid genus or a synonym of Karana.

Species
 Yula argyrospila (Warren, 1912)
 Yula moneta (Warren, 1912)
 Yula muscosa (Hampson, 1891)
 Yula novaeguineae Bethune-Baker, 1906
 Yula submarginata (Warren, 1912)
 Yula tenuilinea (Warren, 1912)

References
Natural History Museum Lepidoptera genus database
Yula at funet

Hadeninae